Pribumia is a genus of southeast Asian cellar spiders erected in 2018 for several species transferred from Pholcus after a molecular phylogenetic study of the Calapnita-Panjange clade of Pholcidae. Six species previously in the minang group of Pholcus were transferred, but P. tahai is now in Apokayana. They have long, thin abdomens and six eyes, three on each of two eye stalks. The name is derived from the local term for Native Indonesians.

Species
 it contains six species:
P. atrigularis (Simon, 1901) – Malaysia, Singapore, Indonesia
P. bohorok (Huber, 2011) – Indonesia (Sumatra)
P. diopsis (Simon, 1901) – Thailand
P. hurau (Huber, 2011) – Indonesia (Sumatra)
P. minang (Huber, 2011) – Indonesia (Sumatra)
P. singalang (Huber, 2011) (type) – Indonesia (Sumatra)

See also
 Pholcus
 Uthina
 Apokayana
 List of Pholcidae species

References

Further reading

Pholcidae genera
Spiders of Asia